Donacesa is a genus of moths of the family Erebidae. The genus was erected by Francis Walker in 1858.

Species
Donacesa miricornis Walker, 1858
Donacesa ochrogaster Hampson, 1926

References

Calpinae